Tapinesthis is a genus of spiders in the family Oonopidae. It was first described in 1914 by Simon. , it contains only one European species, Tapinesthis inermis.

References

Oonopidae
Monotypic Araneomorphae genera